Nizami (until 2004, Vladimirovka; formerly, Vladimirorskoe and Vladimiroskoye) is a village and municipality in the Sabirabad Rayon of Azerbaijan.  In 2004, the village was renamed in honor of the poet, Nizami. It has a population of 2,852.

References 

Populated places in Sabirabad District